Leptodermis is a genus of plants in the family Rubiaceae.

Species

 Leptodermis amoena
 Leptodermis beichuanensis
 Leptodermis brevisepala
 Leptodermis buxifolia
 Leptodermis crassifolia
 Leptodermis dielsiana
 Leptodermis diffusa
 Leptodermis forrestii
 Leptodermis glomerata
 Leptodermis gracilis
 Leptodermis griffithii
 Leptodermis handeliana
 Leptodermis hirsutiflora
 Leptodermis kumaonensis
 Leptodermis lanata
 Leptodermis lanceolata
 Leptodermis lecomtei
 Leptodermis limprichtii
 Leptodermis ludlowii
 Leptodermis oblonga
 Leptodermis ordosica
 Leptodermis ovata
 Leptodermis parkeri
 Leptodermis parvifolia
 Leptodermis pilosa
 Leptodermis potaninii
 Leptodermis pulchella
 Leptodermis pumila
 Leptodermis purdomii
 Leptodermis rehderiana
 Leptodermis riparia
 Leptodermis scabrida
 Leptodermis schneideri
 Leptodermis scissa
 Leptodermis stapfiana
 Leptodermis tomentella
 Leptodermis trifida
 Leptodermis umbellata
 Leptodermis wardii
 Leptodermis velutiniflora
 Leptodermis vestita
 Leptodermis wilsonii
 Leptodermis virgata
 Leptodermis xizangensis
 Leptodermis yui

References

Rubiaceae genera
Paederieae